Ou Ya Dav District is a district in Ratanakiri Province, northeast Cambodia. In 1998, it had a population of 10,898. It contains 29 villages, which are located in seven communes.

Communes

References

Districts of Ratanakiri province